The Embassy of Malaysia in Washington, D.C. is the diplomatic mission of Malaysia to the United States.
It is located at 3516 International Court NW in Washington, D.C.

The embassy also operates Consulates-General in Los Angeles, and New York City.

Dato' Azmil Mohd. Zabidi was appointed ambassador in February 2019.

References

External links

 Official website
 http://www.kln.gov.my/perwakilan/washington
 wikimapia

Malaysia
Washington, D.C.
Malaysia–United States relations
North Cleveland Park